KASU (91.9 FM) is a non-commercial public radio station broadcasting a news-talk-music format. Licensed to Jonesboro, Arkansas, United States, it serves northeast Arkansas, southeast Missouri and West Tennessee with its analog signal. The station has been licensed to Arkansas State University since 1957.

On March 28, 2020, an EF3 tornado directly struck Jonesboro destroying the transmitter site for the station.

Emergency Alert System
KASU is the primary source of messages distributed through the Emergency Alert System in northeast Arkansas. KAIT relays KASU’s signal for tests and KJNB-LD relays KASU’s signal for actual emergencies.

References

External links

FCC history cards for KASU

ASU
ASU
Arkansas State University
NPR member stations
Radio stations established in 1957
1957 establishments in Arkansas